Trzebina  is a village in Opole Voivodeship in southwestern Poland, near the Czech border.

The village was part of the Recovered Territories, annexed from Nazi Germany during the territorial changes of Poland after World War II.

References

Trzebina